A rifleman is a soldier in a rifle unit of infantry. 

Rifleman may also refer to:
A member of the Rifle Brigade (Prince Consort's Own) or any of the brigades and regiments that derive their heritage from the original unit (see The Rifles)
 Rifleman (bird) or Titipounamu (Acanthisitta chloris), a New Zealand bird
 The Rifleman, a U.S. television program starring Chuck Connors
 The Rifleman, a 2019 Latvian war drama
 ST Rifleman, a British tugboat
 Rifleman (arcade game), a 1967 Sega arcade game